Sir Samuel Luke (21 March 1603 – 30 August 1670) sat in the House of Commons from 1640 to 1653 and in 1660, and was an officer in the Parliamentary army during the English Civil War.

Life
Luke was born 21 March 1603 and baptised at six days old in Southill, Bedfordshire. He was the son of Sir Oliver Luke  and his wife, Elizabeth, daughter and coheir of Sir Valentine Knightley of Fawsley, Northants. He attended Eton from 1617 to 1619 and travelled abroad in 1623. He was knighted on 20 July 1624. In April 1640, Luke was elected Member of Parliament for Bedford in the Short Parliament and was re-elected for the Long Parliament in November 1640. In the latter election he is known to have had the support of much of John Bunyan's future congregation.

Luke was governor of the Parliamentary outpost in Newport Pagnell, Buckinghamshire from late 1642 until June 1644 during the English Civil War  During the war he was also Scoutmaster to the Earl of Essex. He subscribed to the Solemn League and Covenant and in 1648 was secluded from the Long Parliament under Pride's Purge.

Luke inherited the family estate on the death of his father in 1651. In April 1660, he was re-elected MP for Bedford in the Convention Parliament. He died in 1670 and was buried on 30 August in Cople, Bedfordshire.

Mention in literature
It is thought that Sir Samuel Luke was the basis for the title character of the satirical heroic poem Hudibras (1662) by Samuel Butler.

Family
On 2 February 1624, Luke married Elizabeth, daughter of William Freeman, haberdasher and merchant, of London.

Notes

References

External links
findagrave.com burial record

 
 

1603 births
1670 deaths
Knights Bachelor
Roundheads
People from Southill, Bedfordshire
History of Buckinghamshire
English MPs 1640 (April)
English MPs 1640–1648
English MPs 1660
People from Cople